Nicolas Andermatt (born 6 November 1995) is a Swiss footballer who plays as a midfielder for  club SpVgg Bayreuth.

Club career
Andermatt made his professional debut for SV Meppen in the 3. Liga on 31 July 2019, coming on as a substitute in the 69th minute for Max Kremer in the 4–2 away win against Chemnitzer FC.

International career
Andermatt made one appearance for the Switzerland under-18 national team, featuring as a substitute in a 3–1 win against Slovenia on 17 April 2013.

Personal life
Andermatt's father, Martin, is a former Swiss international footballer and current manager.

Honours
SpVgg Bayreuth
 Regionalliga Bayern: 2021–22

References

External links
 Profile at DFB.de
 Profile at kicker.de

1995 births
Living people
People from Baar, Switzerland
Sportspeople from the canton of Zug
Swiss men's footballers
Switzerland youth international footballers
Swiss expatriate footballers
Swiss expatriate sportspeople in Germany
Expatriate footballers in Germany
Association football midfielders
TSV 1860 Munich II players
SV Wacker Burghausen players
TSV 1860 Munich players
1. FC Schweinfurt 05 players
SV Meppen players
SpVgg Bayreuth players
Swiss Promotion League players
3. Liga players
Regionalliga players